Paul David McCrane (born January 19, 1961) is an American film, television and theatre actor, as well as a television director and singer. He is known for his portrayal of Montgomery MacNeil in the 1980 film Fame, Frank Berry in the 1984 film The Hotel New Hampshire, Emil Antonowsky in RoboCop, and Robert Romano on the NBC medical drama television series ER.

Early life
McCrane was born on January 19, 1961,  in Philadelphia, Pennsylvania, the son of Eileen C. (née Manyak) and James J. McCrane, Jr.  His family moved to Richboro, Pennsylvania, where he lived until he moved to New York City after graduating from Holy Ghost Preparatory School in 1978. He studied theatre at HB Studio in New York City.

Career
An early role, when he was just 18 years of age, is in a short scene in Rocky II, playing a multi-fracture patient who asks for Rocky's autograph on his head cast ("Hey Rocky...sign my head!").

With an abundance of red hair, McCrane portrayed the earnest Montgomery MacNeil in Fame. He was the lead vocalist on three songs in the feature film: "Dogs in the Yard", "Miles from Here" and "Is it Okay if I Call You Mine?" He also had a solo in "I Sing the Body Electric".

Later, he played confused Frank Berry in The Hotel New Hampshire, murderous Emil Antonowsky in RoboCop, followed by astronaut Pete Conrad in From the Earth to the Moon, Guard Trout in The Shawshank Redemption, cancer-absorbing mutant Leonard Betts in The X-Files. After a recurring role as the snarky Dr. Robert "Rocket" Romano on ER, he became a regular cast member (1997–2003) and returned for one episode during its 15th and final season (2008). McCrane guest-starred in 24 Seasons 5 and 6 as Graem Bauer. He has also appeared on Ugly Betty and CSI: Crime Scene Investigation.

In 2011, McCrane took on the recurring role of Assistant District Attorney Josh Peyton in the NBC television program  Harry's Law, a project of producer David E. Kelley. McCrane won the 2011 Emmy Award for Guest Actor in a Drama Series for his performance in the role. Starting 2019, he has a recurring role in the CBS TV series All Rise.

Filmography

Film

Television

Discography
1980: "Is It Okay If I Call You Mine?" / "Dogs in the Yard"

References

External links

1961 births
Male actors from Philadelphia
American male film actors
American male stage actors
American male television actors
American television directors
Living people
Primetime Emmy Award winners
20th-century American male actors
21st-century American male actors